Antwoine Hackford (born 20 March 2004) is an English professional footballer who plays as a striker for EFL Championship club Sheffield United.

Club career
Born in Arbourthorne, Hackford began his career at Sheffield United, joining the club at the age of 9, and taking part in the first team's pre-season preparations ahead of the 2020–21 season. He became a scholar that year, and was included in The Guardian's 'Next Generation 2020' list of the best young players at Premier League clubs.

He made his senior debut for the club on 2 January 2021, appearing as an 80th-minute substitute for Ben Osborn in a 2–0 away league defeat by Crystal Palace. At the age of 16 years and 288 days, he became their youngest ever Premier League player. Sheffield United manager Chris Wilder said he was "delighted" for Hackford.

He turned professional in June 2021.

In December 2021, he moved National League North side Alfreton Town on a one-month loan, going straight into the squad for the fixture against Curzon Ashton where he scored on his debut in a 2–1 win.

He suffered an ACL injury and missed 11 months of play, returning in November 2022.

International career
Hackford has represented England at under-15 and under-16 levels.

Personal life
His brother is boxer Anthony Tomlinson.

Career statistics

References

2004 births
Living people
English footballers
Sheffield United F.C. players
Alfreton Town F.C. players
Premier League players
National League (English football) players
Association football forwards
Black British sportspeople
England youth international footballers
Footballers from Sheffield